Seven Sharp is a half-hour-long New Zealand current affairs programme produced by Television New Zealand. The programme was created after the discontinuation of Close Up. It broadcasts at 7 pm (straight after 1 News at Six) every weekday on TVNZ 1. Seven Sharp typically presents 3 stories within a 30-minute timeslot every weeknight, and is designed to be more integrated with social media and real time opinions than its predecessor.

Seven Sharp competes mostly with Three's current affairs show The Project; it also shares its time slot with sister channel TVNZ 2's drama Shortland Street, and Prime's The Crowd Goes Wild.

The show is currently presented by Hilary Barry and Jeremy Wells. Toni Street and Mike Hosking left the show in December 2017. Previous fill-in presenters have included Pippa Wetzell, Melissa Stokes, Sam Wallace, Tim Wilson, Carolyn Robinson, Erin Conroy, Stacey Morrison, Heather du Plessis-Allan, Te Radar, Clarke Gayford, Tāmati Coffey, Matt Gibb, Chris Cairns, Brendon Pongia and Rose Matafeo. On one occasion, American actor Rob Schneider appeared as co-host.

The show's primary sponsor is ASB Bank.

Panelists

History

Series 1 (2013)
Seven Sharp premiered on 4 February 2013, with Alison Mau, Jesse Mulligan and Greg Boyed at the desk. The episode featured an interview with Josh Groban and a tour of Prime Minister John Key's office. There are 230 episodes in the first series.

Ratings fell to just under 401,000 viewers for the second episode on 5 February, and hovered between 300,000 and 400,000 for the next week. On 12 February, Campbell Live beat Seven Sharp in the ratings with Campbell Live gaining 346,850 viewers compared to Seven Sharp only gaining 290,710 viewers. This was the first time Campbell Live had ever gained a higher audience than TV One for the 7 pm7:30 pm timeslot.

Greg Boyed left the show on 6 September, and returned to hosting Tonight.

Alison Mau left on the final episode of the series, to host a show on Radio Live with Willie Jackson from noon to 3 pm on weekdays.

Series 2 (2014)
The second series of Seven Sharp premiered on 27 January 2014 with Mike Hosking, Toni Street, and Jesse Mulligan at the desk, and has 230 episodes.

On 7 February, there was no episode because the IRB Sevens was aired in the timeslot.

On 8 April, the show gained just over 500,000 viewers – the first time the audience number has gone above that of the debut episode.

Jesse Mulligan left the Seven Sharp panel on 17 April, and TVNZ announced that it wouldn't hire another host. This changed the show from the three-presenter format it had held since its inception to a two-presenter format.

On 18 April there was no episode because it was Good Friday (despite an episode being aired on Good Friday in 2013).

On 28 August, 5 September, and 17 September, Seven Sharp was not aired, instead, the  timeslot was used to broadcast the One News leaders' debates regarding the 2014 New Zealand general election, moderated by Seven Sharp host Mike Hosking. The first debate was between current Prime Minister John Key and Leader of the Opposition David Cunliffe, the second between the leaders of eight minor parties, and the third between Key and Cunliffe.

Series 3 (2015)

The third series of Seven Sharp premiered on 2 February 2015, and has 229 episodes.

On 6 February, there was no episode because the IRB Sevens was aired in the timeslot.

While Street was on maternity leave in mid-2015, her position was filled by Pippa Wetzell on Mondays–Thursdays and Nadine Chalmers-Ross (now Higgins) on Fridays.

Series 4 (2016)
The fourth series of Seven Sharp premiered on 1 February 2016, and has 231 episodes.

On 25 March, there was no episode because it was Good Friday.

Series 5 (2017)

The fifth series of Seven Sharp premiered on 7 February 2017, and has 217 episodes.

No episodes aired on 14 or 17 April due to Easter. There was also no episode on 5 June due to Queen's Birthday. 

On 31 August, 8 September, and 20 September, Seven Sharp was not aired, instead, the  timeslot will be used to broadcast the 1 News leaders' debates regarding the 2017 New Zealand general election, moderated by Seven Sharp host Mike Hosking. The first debate was between current Prime Minister Bill English and Leader of the Opposition Jacinda Ardern, the second between the leaders of minor parties, and the third between English and Ardern. Hoskings' appointment as the moderator was controversial; a 76,000 petition to remove him as moderator was signed and delivered to TVNZ's head of news and current affairs John Gillespie. Due to Hosking's illness, Corin Dann moderated the minor party debate.

There was no episode on 23 October for Labour Day.

On 14 December (during the year's penultimate episode), Street and Hosking announced that they would be leaving Seven Sharp at the end of year due to their breakfast radio commitments.

Series 6 (2018)
The sixth series of Seven Sharp premiered on 5 February 2018, with new hosts Hilary Barry and Jeremy Wells, and has 226 episodes.

Series 7 (2019)
The seventh series of Seven Sharp premiered on 21 January 2019, and has 197 episodes.

Reception
Seven Sharp was criticized around its inception for its new format, with some media commentators saying that "TVNZ [had exchanged Close Ups] current affairs for a mess of pottage".

References

2010s New Zealand television series
2020s New Zealand television series
2013 New Zealand television series debuts
New Zealand television news shows
TVNZ 1 original programming